Camden Harbor or Camden Harbour may refer to:
 Camden, Maine
 Camden Sound, Western Australia
 Camden Harbour, Western Australia, a short-lived settlement in Camden Sound.